{{Speciesbox
| image = EV-0049 Charaxes petersi (3666502780).jpg
| image2 = 
| display_parents = 3
| taxon = Charaxes petersi
| authority = van Someren, 1969<ref>Van Someren, V.G.L. 1969. Revisional notes on African Charaxes (Lepidoptera: Nymphalidae). Part V. Bulletin of the British Museum (Natural History) (Entomology) 23: 75-166.</ref>
| synonyms =
}}Charaxes petersi, the Peters' demon charaxes, is a butterfly in the family Nymphalidae. It is found in Guinea, Sierra Leone, Liberia, Ivory Coast and Ghana. The habitat consists of  primary lowland evergreen forests. It is a scarce species of Charaxes.  

TaxonomyCharaxes petersi is a member of the large species group Charaxes etheocles.

Closely related to Charaxes contrarius and Charaxes grahamei 
References

Victor Gurney Logan Van Someren, 1969 Revisional notes on African Charaxes (Lepidoptera: Nymphalidae). Part V. Bulletin of the British Museum'' (Natural History) (Entomology) 75-166.

External links
Charaxes petersi images at Consortium for the Barcode of Life

Butterflies described in 1969
petersi